Rodney Thomas II (born June 26, 1998) is an American football safety for the Indianapolis Colts in the National Football League (NFL). Thomas played 4 years of college football at Yale.

Professional career
Thomas was drafted by the Indianapolis Colts with the 239th pick in the seventh round of the 2022 NFL Draft. In Week 5 of the 2022 Season, on Thursday Night Football, Thomas intercepted Broncos Quarterback Russell Wilson.

References

External links
 Indianapolis Colts bio
  Yale Bulldogs bio

Living people
American football safeties
Yale Bulldogs football players
Indianapolis Colts players
Players of American football from Pittsburgh
1998 births